Superfinishing, also known as micromachining, microfinishing, and short-stroke honing, is a metalworking process that improves surface finish and workpiece geometry. This is achieved by removing just the thin amorphous surface layer left by the last process with an abrasive stone or tape; this layer is usually about 1 μm in magnitude. Superfinishing, unlike polishing which produces a mirror finish, creates a cross-hatch pattern on the workpiece.

The superfinishing process was developed by the Chrysler Corporation in 1934.

Process
After a metal piece is ground to an initial finish, it is superfinished with a finer grit solid abrasive. The abrasive is oscillated or rotated while the workpiece is rotated in the opposite direction; these motions are what causes the cross-hatching. The geometry of the abrasive depends on the geometry of the workpiece surface; a stone (rectangular shape) is for cylindrical surfaces and cups and wheels are used for flat and spherical surfaces. A lubricant is used to minimize heat production, which can alter the metallurgical properties, and to carry away the swarf; kerosene is a common lubricant.

The abrasive cuts the surface of the workpiece in three phases. The first phase is when the abrasive first contacts the workpiece surface: dull grains of the abrasive fracture and fall away leaving a new sharp cutting surface. In the second phase the abrasive "self dresses" while most of the stock is being removed. Finally, the abrasive grains become dull as they work which improves the surface geometry.

The average rotational speed of abrasive wheel and/or workpiece is 1 to 15 surface m/min, with 6 to 14 m/min preferred; this is much slower compared to grinding speeds around 1800 to 3500 m/min.

Superfinishing can give a surface finish of 0.01 μm.

Types
There are three types superfinishing: Through-feed, plunge, and wheels.

Through-feed  This type of superfinishing is used for cylindrical workpieces. The workpiece is rotated between two drive rollers, which also move the machine as well. Four to eight progressively finer abrasive stones are used to superfinish the workpiece. The stones contact the workpiece at a 90° angle and are oscillated axially. Examples of parts that would be produced by process include tapered rolls, piston pins, shock absorber rods, shafts, and needles.

Plunge  This type is used to finish irregularly shaped surfaces. The workpiece is rotated while the abrasive plunges onto the desired surface.

Wheels  Abrasive cups or wheels are used to superfinish flat and spherical surfaces. The wheel and workpiece are rotated in opposite directions, which creates the cross-hatching. If the two are parallel then the result if a flat finish, but if the wheel is tilted slightly a convex or concave surface will form.

Abrasives
Common abrasives used for superfinishing include aluminum oxide, silicon carbide, cubic boron nitride (CBN) and diamond.

Aluminum oxide is used for "roughing" operations. Silicon carbide, which is harder than aluminum oxide, is used for "finishing" operations. CBN and diamond are not as commonly used, but find use with specialized materials such as ceramics and M50 tool steel. Note that graphite may be mixed with other abrasives to add lubricity and to enhance the appearance of the finish.

Abrasive grains must be very fine to be used with superfinishing; usually 5–8 μm.

Advantages and disadvantages
Advantages of superfinishing include: increasing part life, decreasing wear, closer tolerances, higher load bearing surfaces, better sealing capabilities, and elimination of a break in period.

The main disadvantage is that superfinishing requires grinding or a hard turning operation beforehand, which increases cost. Superfinishing has a lower cutting efficiency because of smaller chips and lower material removal rate. Superfinishing stones are softer and wear more quickly, however they do not need to be dressed.

Applications
Common applications include: steering rack components, transmission components, fuel injector components, camshaft lobes, hydraulic cylinder rods, bearing races, needle rollers, and sharpening stones and wheels.

It has been proven that superfinishing certain parts makes them more durable. For example, if the teeth in a gear are superfinished they will last up to four times as long.

See also
Abrasive machining
Honing
Lapping

References

Notes

Bibliography
.
.

Grinding and lapping